Rete Italia is an Italian-language radio network which broadcast to selected capital cities in Australia. The station is associated with Il Globo Newspaper and La Fiamma newspaper.

The radio network was launched in 1994.

To listen to the app, visit their website.

Rete Italia is part of Niche Radio Network, which broadcasts multiple languages.

See also
List of radio stations in Australia
Rete Airplay Chart

References

External links

Italian-Australian culture
Radio stations in Melbourne
Australian radio networks
Italian-language radio stations